Bill Anoatubby (born November 8, 1945) is the Governor of the Chickasaw Nation, a position he has held since 1987. From 1979 to 1987, Anoatubby served two terms as Lieutenant Governor of the Chickasaw Nation in the administration of Governor Overton James, after being popularly elected to office.

Early life and education
Anoatubby was born in Denison, Texas. After his father died before his third birthday, his widowed mother moved with him to Tishomingo, Oklahoma, the first Chickasaw capital. In 1964, Anoatubby graduated from Tishomingo High School, where he played football and was active in student government.

He attended Murray State College in Tishomingo, before transferring to East Central University in Ada, where he earned a bachelor's degree in accounting. Anoatubby undertook additional studies in business and finance at ECU and Southeastern Oklahoma State University in Durant, Oklahoma. During his college years, he also served in the Oklahoma Army National Guard. He attained the rank of staff sergeant and command of a light truck platoon, before his honorable discharge in 1971.

Early career
From 1972 to 1974, Anoatubby was employed as an office manager for American Plating Company. From 1974 to 1975, he was employed by the Little Giant Corporation, working in the areas of accounting, budgeting, financial analysis, and electronic data processing.

Early tribal career
In July 1975, Anoatubby was hired by the Chickasaw Nation government, then based in Sulphur, Oklahoma, to serve as Director of Tribal Health Services. He managed tribal health programs in a 13-county region of South Central Oklahoma.

The following year, he accepted appointment as director of the tribal accounting department, where he was responsible for development and improvement of tribal accounting systems. In 1978, he was appointed as special assistant to the governor and controller. He provided program and personnel management, including supervision of tribal department directors. The following year, Anoatubby was popularly elected as the first Lieutenant Governor of the Chickasaw Nation, serving with Governor Overton James. He was re-elected for a second term in 1983.

Governor
In 1987, Anoatubby was elected as the 30th Governor of the Chickasaw Nation, the twelfth-largest tribe in the United States. He is now serving his 9th consecutive term in office, having been reelected in 1991, 1995, 1999, 2003, 2007, 2011, 2015, and 2019; on four occasions he faced no opposition.

As governor, he administers all the Nation's programs and businesses and, indirectly its more than 13,500 employees. There are more than 200 tribal programs and services, and more than 100 tribal businesses. Anoatubby has devised a multi-pronged approach to improving conditions for the tribe in the areas of tribal finance, education, business and economic development, environmental protection, and healthcare.

Anoatubby has been described as a modest, almost self-effacing politician who seems happy to share the credit for the Nation's successes. He has achieved the following:

 He focused on raising funds to provide more opportunities for higher education. The previous annual budget included $200,000 from the BIA, supporting 157 scholarships. By 2017, the Nation provided more than $19.4 million in annual funds for scholarships, grants, and other educational contributions.
 In 1994, the Chickasaw Nation took responsibility from the Indian Health Service to establish, grow and maintain its own health care system. Using its own funds, the nation opened a $150 million medical center, supplemented by four health clinics. The Chickasaw Department of Health, which oversees the facilities, in 2017 attracted more than 552,000 patient visits and filled more than 1.7 million prescriptions.
 The Chickasaw Nation was the first Native American tribe to become a partner in the Healthy Meals for Kids program sponsored by the federal government.

National politics
Anoatubby decided to run for national office in the 1998 election, he sought the Democratic Party nomination for the 3rd District U.S. House seat. At the time the district took in territory in the rural southeast of the state, including the area historically reserved for the Choctaw Nation, and some of the lands belonging to the Chickasaw and Muscogee Creek nations. After the Civil War, following strong migration by European Americans from the South, this area was later also known as "Little Dixie."

Anoatubby placed third in the four-candidate field in the Democratic primary. Following his defeat, he endorsed state senator Darryl Roberts, who eventually won the Democratic nomination. But Roberts was defeated by the Republican incumbent, Wes Watkins, who won re-election at a time of shifting political alliances by people in the state. (In 2003, the 3rd congressional district was totally redefined as taking in territory in the northwest part of the state rather than the southeast.)

In 2014 Anoatubby was mentioned as a possible candidate for the U.S. Senate special election that year to replace Tom Coburn, but he decided not to run.

Despite being a Democrat, Anoatubby endorsed conservative Republican and fellow Chickasaw T. W. Shannon in the 2022 United States Senate special election in Oklahoma.

Community involvement
In addition to serving as governor, Anoatubby has been a member of numerous civic and governmental organizations at the local, state, regional and national levels. As of June 2018, he has served as  member and past president of the Inter-Tribal Council of the Five Civilized Tribes, the American Mothers Advisory Council, the American Indian Cultural Center Foundation, the Arkansas Riverbed Authority, the Dean A. McGee Board of Trustees, Murray State College Foundation, past chairman of the Harold Hamm Diabetes Center Board of Advisors, chairman of the Native American Cultural and Educational Foundation, the Oklahoma Business Roundtable Executive Committee, Oklahoma Medical Research Foundation Board of Directors, Oklahoma State Fair, Inc. Board of Directors, Oklahoma Hall of Fame Board of Directors, Oklahoman's for the Arts Board of Directors, OU Price School of Business Board of Advisors, Task Force on the Future of Higher Education, and the Goddard Center Primary Board.

Honors
Anoatubby was inducted into the Oklahoma Hall of Fame in 2004. In 2017, he was awarded the Harland C. Stonecipher Award for Entrepreneurial Vision, the James R. Tollbert III Crystal Orchid Award, the World Experiences Foundation Lifetime Achievement Award in Global Citizenship, and the Lee B. Brawner Lifetime Achievement Award.

Awards and honors include:
2019 NAFOA Lifetime Achievement Award
2019 Oklahoma Center of Community and Justice Humanitarian Award
2019 Force 50 Foundation George Nigh Lifetime Achievement Award
2018 National Cowboy Museum's Annie Oakley Society's Frank Butler Award
2017 Harland C. Stonecipher Award for Entrepreneurial Vision
2017 James R. Tolbert III Crystal Orchid Award
2017 World Experiences Foundation Lifetime Achievement Award in Global Citizenship
2017 Lee B. Brawner Lifetime Achievement Award
2016 Creative Oklahoma Creativity Ambassador
2016 Louis B. Russell, Jr. Memorial Award for Service to Minority and Underserved Populations
2016 Helen Chupco Leadership Award
2015 Harold Hamm Diabetes Center Board Member of the Year
2015 Cherokee National Historical Society Stalwart Award
2015 Oklahoma Association of Community Colleges Hall of Fame Inductee
2015 Dialogue Institute of Oklahoma Leadership Award
2015 Ada Area Chamber of Commerce Ted Savage Lifetime Achievement Award
2014 Knights of Columbus John F. Kennedy Community Service Award
2014 Oklahoma Academy Key Contributor Award
2013 Oklahoma Israel Exchange Light, Leadership and Legacy Award
2013 ASTEC Fund Door Opener Award
2013 East Central University Distinguished Philanthropist Award
2013 Oklahoma Historians Hall of Fame Inductee
2012 Citizen Energy Advocate of the Year of Award
2011 Chisholm Trail Heritage Center Trail Boss Award
2011 Oklahoma Health Center Foundation Treasures for Tomorrow, Outstanding Innovative Leader
2010 International Economic Development Council (IEDC) Leadership Award for Public Service
2010 Oklahoma City University's Meinders School of Business Chairman's Award
2009 Festival of Hope Honoree, Heartline Organization
2009 Leadership Oklahoma's Distinguished Graduate
2009 Board of the American Indian Exposition Indian of the Year
2008 Native American Finance Officers Association Tribal Leader of the Year Award
2008 Oklahoma Conference on Aging Lifetime Achievement Award
2008 National Governors Association Private Citizen Award
2007 Red Earth Ambassador
2007 Oklahoma Institute for Child Advocacy Outstanding Service to Oklahoma's Children Award
2007 Minority Advocate of the Year, U.S. Small Business Administration
2007 Oklahoma Heritage Association "Centennial Leadership award for Preservation of State & Local History"
2006 Oklahoma Mental Health Consumer Council "Humanitarian of the Year" Award
2005 Awarded the "Most Honored One" and "Friend of the Court" by the Oklahoma Supreme Court
2004 Oklahoma Hall of Fame Inductee
2004 Jacobson Foundation Honoree Award
2000 Distinguished Service Award from the Murray State College Foundation
1999 Tri-County Indian Nations Community Development Corporation Leadership Award
1998 Honoree, Community Literacy Center
1997 Ada Chamber of Commerce Leadership Award
1997 City of Ada A+ Award
1997 Oklahoma Governor's Arts Award
1997 Distinguished Alumnus, East Central University
1997 Distinguished Alumnus, National Community College Association
1995 Minority Advocate of the Year, U.S. Small Business Administration
Who's Who in America
Who's Who in the South and Southwest

Personal life
Anoatubby lives in Ada, Oklahoma with his wife, Janice. They have two sons, Brian and Chris. Chris and his wife Becky have three children, Brendan, Eryn and Sydney. Brian and his wife Melinda have two children, Chloe and Preslea. He has a brother named Russel Anoatubby. He has three nieces Loretta (Cricket) Anoatubby, Lou Ann Anoatubby-Taylor, and Johna Anoatubby.

Notes

References

External links
Voices of Oklahoma interview with Bill Anoatubby. First person interview conducted on October 18, 2010, with Bill Anoatubby.

1945 births
Living people
20th-century Native American politicians
21st-century Native American politicians
East Central University alumni
Governors of the Chickasaw Nation
Oklahoma Democrats
Oklahoma National Guard personnel
Native American Christians
People from Ada, Oklahoma
People from Denison, Texas
People from Tishomingo, Oklahoma
Southeastern Oklahoma State University alumni